The 1991 Australian Production Car Championship was a CAMS sanctioned national motor racing title for drivers of Group 3E Series Production Cars.
The title was contested over an eight-round series.
 Round 1, Sandown, Victoria, 24 February
 Round 2, Symmons Plains, Tasmania, 10 March
 Round 3, Winton, Victoria, 5 May
 Round 4, Amaroo Park, New South Wales, 2 June
 Round 5, Mallala, South Australia, 23 June
 Round 6, Lakeside, Queensland, 14 July
 Round 7, Oran Park, New South Wales, 11 August
 Round 8, Sandown, Victoria, 1 September

Results

Championship points were awarded on a 20-15-12-10-8-6-4-3-2-1 basis for the top ten outright places at each round.
Points for the Front Wheel Drive Class, in which cars were restricted to engines of under 2000cc capacity, were awarded on a 9-6-4-3-2-1 basis for the top six class places at each round.
Drivers could retain the points from their best seven round results.

References

 Australian  Motor Racing Year, 1991/92
 CAMS Manual of Motor Sport, 1991
 Official Programme, Mallala, 23 June 1991
 www.camsmanual.com.au
 www.procar.com.au (retrieved 4 February 2003)

Australian Production Car Championship
Production Car Championship